Naranji is a town and Union Council of Swabi District in NWFP. It is located at 34°19'0N 72°25'0E with an altitude of 537 metres (1765 feet).

References

Populated places in Swabi District
Union Councils of Swabi District